Östen Dahl (born 4 November 1945 in Stockholm) is a Swedish linguist and professor best known for pioneering a marker-based approach to tense and aspect in linguistic typology. Dahl finished his PhD at the University of Gothenburg and subsequently worked there as a docent before becoming professor of general linguistics at the University of Stockholm in 1980.

Honours
 Royal Swedish Academy of Sciences, member since 1997
 Royal Swedish Academy of Letters, History and Antiquities, member since 1998
 Academia Europaea, member since 2006
 honorary doctorate of philosophy from the University of Helsinki in 2003
 Norwegian Academy of Science and Letters, member

Works 
 [https://www.su.se/polopoly_fs/1.251617.1444651289!/menu/standard/file/Tense%26aspectsystems.pdf Tense and Aspect Systems], Oxford: Blackwell, 1985
 edited with Maria Koptjevskaja-Tamm: The Circum-Baltic Languages: Grammar and typology, Amsterdam: Benjamins, 2001
 Grammaticalization in the North: Noun phrase morphosyntax in Scandinavian vernaculars. Berlin: Language Science Press 2015. http://langsci-press.org/catalog/view/73/17/290-1 (Open Access)

See also 
 Jespersen's Cycle

References

External links
 Staff profile at Stockholm University

1945 births
Living people
Linguists from Sweden
Academic staff of the University of Gothenburg
University of Gothenburg alumni
Academic staff of Stockholm University
Scientists from Stockholm
Members of the Royal Swedish Academy of Sciences
Members of the Norwegian Academy of Science and Letters